The Texas Collegiate Hockey Conference (TCHC) is a college ice hockey conference within the American Collegiate Hockey Association that plays at the Division II level. All eight members schools are universities located within the state of Texas.

History
The TCHC was formed in 2016 with the original members consisting of Texas A&M, the University of Texas, the University of Texas at El Paso, Texas State, Texas Christian University, Dallas Baptist University, Texas Tech and the University of North Texas.

The conference currently competes within the ACHA Division II West Region, with the league champion earning an automatic bid to the ACHA Division II regional tournament.

Members

Former Members
Dallas Baptist University
University of Texas, El Paso

Year-by-year

See also
American Collegiate Hockey Association

References

ACHA Division 2 conferences
Ice hockey in Texas
2016 establishments in Texas